Sergey Sergeyevich Matveychik (born 5 June 1988) is a Belarusian professional footballer who plays for Gomel.

International career
Matveychik was part of the Belarus U21 that finished in 3rd place at the 2011 UEFA European Under-21 Football Championship. He played in two of the matches, receiving a red card in the game against Switzerland U21.

Matveychik made his debut for the senior national side of his country on 15 November 2014, in a match against Spain in a Euro 2016 qualifier, playing the full 90 minutes.

Honours
Gomel
Belarusian Cup winner: 2010–11, 2021–22
Belarusian Super Cup winner: 2012

Shakhtyor Soligorsk
Belarusian Premier League champion: 2020
Belarusian Cup winner: 2013–14, 2018–19

References

External links
Profile from Gomel 

1988 births
Living people
People from Zhlobin District
Sportspeople from Gomel Region
Belarusian footballers
Association football defenders
Belarus international footballers
Belarusian Premier League players
FC Gomel players
FC Shakhtyor Soligorsk players
FC Dinamo Minsk players